Aidan O'Rourke (born 1984) is a manager and former Gaelic footballer. He played from 2001 to 2009, winning an All Star and an All-Ireland Senior Football Championship as a player for the Armagh county team in 2002.

Playing career
Born in County Armagh, O'Rourke played football with his local club Dromintee St Patrick's GAC. A member of the Armagh senior football team between 2001 and 2006, and again in 2008 and 2009, he won one All-Ireland Senior Football Championship in 2002, the same year as he won his only All Star award. He was also on the team that won the National Football League in 2005.

Management career
On 8 October 2012, O'Rourke was named Louth manager for a two-year term, after previous involvement with Kildare and Down as a selector. O'Rourke left the role in mid-2014.

In January 2015, he was appointed manager of the Armagh minor Gaelic football team.

After Kevin McStay stood aside as Roscommon senior manager in 2018, O'Rourke was the preferred replacement; however, he withdrew and Anthony Cunningham was appointed instead.

In October 2022, O'Rourke was appointed as head coach of the Donegal senior footballers, under the management of Paddy Carr.

Honours
Team
 1 All-Ireland Senior Football Championship (2002)
 7 Ulster Senior Football Championships (1999, 2000, 2002, 2004, 2005, 2006, 2008)
 1 National Football League Division 1 (2005)
 2 Ulster Minor League & Championships (1992, 1994)

Individual
 1 Irish News Ulster All Stars Award (2003)
 1 All Stars Award (2002)

References

 

1984 births
Living people
Armagh inter-county Gaelic footballers
Donegal county football team
Down county football team
Dromintee St Patrick's Gaelic footballers
Gaelic football backs
Gaelic football managers
Gaelic football selectors
Kildare county football team
Winners of one All-Ireland medal (Gaelic football)